Entwistle may refer to:

People
Entwistle (surname)
John Entwistle (1944–2002), English musician, bassist of The Who
Peg Entwistle (1908-1932), British stage and film actress
 Entwisle, a related surname

Places
Entwistle, Alberta, a small town in Alberta, Canada
Entwistle, Lancashire, a village in Turton, England
Entwistle railway station, the railway station for Entwistle

See also
Entwisle, a minor planet discovered in 1998